Robert J. McGeehan (August 26, 1854 – July 9, 1911) was a member of the Wisconsin State Assembly and the Wisconsin State Senate.

Biography
McGeehan was born on August 26, 1854 in the Province of Canada. He moved to Wrightstown, Wisconsin in 1870. McGeehan died on July 9, 1911 in De Pere, Wisconsin.

Career
McGeehan was a member of the Assembly from 1889 to 1890 and from 1891 to 1892 and of the Senate in 1893 and from 1895 to 1896. In addition, he was an alderman of De Pere from 1893 to 1895 and mayor of De Pere, as well as a member of the Brown County, Wisconsin Board and the Wisconsin Democratic Committee.

References

Canadian emigrants to the United States
People from De Pere, Wisconsin
Democratic Party Wisconsin state senators
Democratic Party members of the Wisconsin State Assembly
County supervisors in Wisconsin
Mayors of places in Wisconsin
Wisconsin city council members
1854 births
1911 deaths
19th-century American politicians
People from Wrightstown, Wisconsin